One of the application of Student's t-test is to test the location of one sequence of independent and identically distributed random variables. If we want to test the locations of multiple sequences of such variables, Šidák correction should be applied in order to calibrate the level of the Student's t-test. Moreover, if we want to test the locations of nearly infinitely many sequences of variables, then Šidák correction should be used, but with caution. More specifically, the validity of Šidák correction depends on how fast the number of sequences goes to infinity.

Introduction

Suppose we are interested in  different hypotheses, and would like to check if all of them are true. Now the hypothesis test scheme becomes

Let  be the level of this test (the type-I error), that is, the probability that we falsely reject  when it is true. 

We aim to design a test with certain level . 

If these 's are independent, then a test for  can be developed by the following procedure, known as Šidák correction.

Step 1, we test each of  null hypotheses at level .

Step 2, if any of these  null hypotheses is rejected, we reject .

Finite case

For finitely many t-tests,
suppose  where for each ,  are independently and identically distributed, for each   are independent but not necessarily identically distributed, and  has finite fourth moment.

This test can be based on the t-statistic of each sequences, that is,

 

where:

 

Using Šidák correction, we reject  if any of  the t-tests based on the t-statistics above reject at level  More specifically, we reject  when

 

where

 

The test defined above has asymptotic level , because

Infinite case

In some cases, the number of sequences, increase as the data size of each sequences, increase. In particular, suppose . If this is true, then we will need to test a null including infinitely many hypotheses, that is

To design a test, Šidák correction may be applied, as in the case of finitely many t-test. However, when , the Šidák correction for t-test may not achieve the level we want, that is, the true level of the test may not converges to the nominal level  as n goes to infinity. This result is related to high-dimensional statistics and is proven by Fan, Hall and Yao (2007). Specifically, if we want the true level of the test converges to the nominal level , then we need a restraint on how fast . Indeed,

 Actually, if we apply bootstrapping method to the calibration of level, then we will only need  even if  has asymmetric distribution.

The results above are based on Central Limit Theorem. According to Central Limit Theorem, each of our t-statistics  possesses asymptotic standard normal distribution, and so the difference between the distribution of each  and the standard normal distribution is asymptotically negligible. The question is, if we aggregate all the differences between the distribution of each  and the standard normal distribution, is this aggregation of differences still asymptotically ignorable?

When we have finitely many , the answer is yes. But when we have infinitely many , the answer some time becomes no. This is because in the latter case we are summing up infinitely many infinitesimal terms. If the number of the terms goes to infinity too fast, that is,  too fast, then the sum may not be zero, the distribution of the t-statistics can not be approximated by the standard normal distribution, the true level does not converges to the nominal level , and then the Šidák correction fails.

See also 
 Šidák correction
 Multiple comparisons
 Bonferroni correction
 Family-wise error rate
 Closed testing procedure

Notes

References
 

Multiple comparisons